Muhammad Nawaz Chohan (born 13 May 1953) is a Pakistani politician who had been a Member of the Provincial Assembly of the Punjab from August 2018 till January 2023. Previously, he was a Member of the Provincial Assembly of the Punjab, from December 2012 to May 2018.

Early life and education
He was born on 13 May 1953 in Gujranwala.

He has received matriculation level education.

Political career
He was elected to the Provincial Assembly of the Punjab as a candidate of Pakistan Muslim League (N) (PML-N) from Constituency PP-92 (Gujranwala-II) in by-polls held in December 2012. He received 36,537 votes and defeated a candidate of Pakistan Peoples Party.

He was re-elected to the Provincial Assembly of the Punjab as a candidate of PML-N from Constituency PP-92 (Gujranwala-II) in 2013 Pakistani general election.

In December 2013, he was appointed as Parliamentary Secretary for transport.

He was re-elected to Provincial Assembly of the Punjab as a candidate of PML-N from Constituency PP-55 (Gujranwala-V) in 2018 Pakistani general election.

References

Living people
Punjab MPAs 2013–2018
Punjab MPAs 2008–2013
1953 births
Pakistan Muslim League (N) MPAs (Punjab)
Punjab MPAs 2018–2023